Villamiroglio (Vilamireu in Piedmontese) is a comune (municipality) in the Province of Alessandria in the Italian region Piedmont, located about  east of Turin and about  northwest of Alessandria.

Villamiroglio borders the following municipalities: Cerrina Monferrato, Gabiano, Moncestino, Odalengo Grande, and Verrua Savoia.

Demographic evolution

HEY

References

Cities and towns in Piedmont